Aliso (Spanish for "alder" or "sycamore") may refer to:

Places

North Rhine-Westphalia, Germany
Aliso (Roman camp), military and civilian colony in ancient Germany, built by the emperor Augustus

Sonora, Mexico
Sierra El Aliso, a mountain range

California, United States
In California, aliso refers to Platanus racemosa, the Western sycamore.

Los Angeles County
 Aliso Creek (Los Angeles County), a major tributary of the Upper Los Angeles River
 Aliso Canyon Oil Field, an oil field and natural gas storage facility in the Santa Susana Mountains
 Aliso Village, a former housing project in Los Angeles
 Pico/Aliso station, a light rail station on the L Line and E Line of the Los Angeles Metro system

Orange County
 Aliso Creek (Orange County), an urban stream
 Aliso Canyon, a canyon carved by the creek
 Aliso and Wood Canyons Wilderness Park, a major regional park in the San Joaquin Hills
 Aliso Elementary School, a public elementary school
 Aliso Niguel High School, a public high school
 Aliso Viejo, California, a city
 Rancho Cañada de los Alisos, a Mexican land grant in present-day Orange County

Argentina
 Campo de los Alisos National Park

Ecuador
 Aliso (volcano), aka Pan de Azúcar

France
 Aliso (river), a small coastal river in Corsica

Other uses
 Aliso: A Journal of Systematic and Evolutionary Botany, a scientific journal on botany

See also
 Alissos, Greece, a village
 Aliso Creek (disambiguation)
 Aliso Canyon (disambiguation)

References